Andrew Renton (born 1963) is Professor of Curating at Goldsmiths, University of London.

Selected publications
Technique Anglaise: Current Trends in British Art. Thames & Hudson, London, 1991.  (Edited with Liam Gillick)

References

External links 
Interview with Andrew Renton. MyTemplArt.

Academics of Goldsmiths, University of London
Living people
1963 births
Date of birth missing (living people)